Sir George Ryan KGCN GCM (born June 18, 1934) is a Montserrat-born Antiguan contractor, businessman and philanthropist based in Antigua and Barbuda.

Early life and career 
Ryan was born in Plymouth, Montserrat, in 1934. In the 1950s, he moved to Antigua to work with Reverend Jack Piper as a mason's apprentice to assist in building the St. John's Pentecostal Church in Antigua. After working on the church, he later apprenticed at many local Antiguan construction companies before founding Ryan's Construction in 1965. He went on to establish Antigua Plumbing and Hardware Centre Ltd. and Antigua Motors 1974 Ltd., City View Hotel, and Ryan’s Place. By 2006, the size of his business holdings expanded to the point of him being named one of the twelve largest investors in Antigua by sales volume.

He is also an active philanthropist donating to the state, arts as well as the misfortunate. He was involved in several government-commissioned projects throughout the 70s and 80s such as building stands first ever test match at the Antigua Recreation Ground, refurbishing the St. John’s Police Station, donating the first set of police motor vehicles to the state, as well as major renovation and construction at the Antigua State College for a period of 15 years.

Personal life 
Ryan has seven children, including George-Ann Ryan who is Chief Financial Officer of the Sadie Collective and Paul Ryan who is The First Indonesian Honorary Consul to Antigua and Barbuda.  He has been married to Lady N. Joycelyn Ryan since 1991.

Awards and honors 
In 2005, Ryan was awarded the Grand Cross (GCM) in the Most Illustrious Order of Merit. In 2018, he was awarded the honor of Knight Commander of the Most Distinguished Order of the Nation (KCN), Antigua's highest award of distinction second only to National Hero status, for contributions to the business landscape and economic development in celebration of the island's 37th anniversary of independence.

References 

Antigua and Barbuda businesspeople
1934 births
Living people
Recipients of the Order of the Nation (Antigua and Barbuda)